Kodama (written: ,  or ) is a Japanese surname. Notable people with the surname include:

, Japanese basketball player
 Arata Kodama (born 1982), Japanese football defender
 Fusako Kodama (born 1945), Japanese photographer
 Kodama Gentarō (1852–1906), Japanese general of the Russo-Japanese War
 Haruka Kodama (born 1996), Japanese idol singer, member of HKT48 and AKB48
 Hideo Kodama (1876–1947), pre-World War II Japanese politician and cabinet minister
 Hideo Kodama (designer) (born 1944), Japanese General Motors Europe automobile designer
, Japanese sociologist
 Kazuoki Kodama (born 1965), Japanese Nordic combined skier
 Kenji Kodama (born 1949), Japanese anime director, and storyboard artist best known for directing the anime Case Closed and working with the anime Lupin III
 Kiyoshi Kodama (1934–2011), Japanese actor and TV personality
 Mari Kodama, international pianist born in Osaka, Japan and raised in Paris
 María Kodama (born 1937), personal assistant and later wife of Jorge Luis Borges
 , Japanese classical pianist
 Rieko Kodama (born 1963), video game designer involved with some of Sega's high-profile projects
, Japanese footballer
, Japanese rower
 Yoshio Kodama (1911–1984), prominent figure in the rise of organized crime in Japan
 Yuichi Kodama, Japanese video director
, Japanese manga artist

Japanese-language surnames